RealmsCon is an annual three-day multi-genre convention held during September/October at the Emerald Beach Hotel in Corpus Christi, Texas. The convention was created in 2005 by Daniel Velasquez.

Programming
The convention typically features an artists alley, cosplay contests, movie rooms, rave, role-playing, table-top gaming, video games, vendors, and workshops.

History
RealmsCon started in 2005 as a science-fiction and comic book event with some anime, until the organizers found that most attendees were coming to the convention for anime. The convention in 2005 cost $20,000 and rose to $50,000+ in 2009. The convention in 2013 had content from the South Texas Underground Film Festival. In 2014 a cosplay fundraiser walk was held to support the Coastal Bend Court Appointed Special Advocates (CASA). The convention again supported CASA in 2015. RealmsCon had free outdoor events in 2018. RealmsCon 2020 and 2021 were cancelled due to the COVID-19 pandemic. RealmsCon went on hiatus starting in 2022.

Event history

References

Multigenre conventions
Recurring events established in 2005
2005 establishments in Texas
Annual events in Texas
Conventions in Texas
Culture of Corpus Christi, Texas
Tourist attractions in Corpus Christi, Texas